The 100, The 10, and The 1,000 are fictional organized crime groups appearing in American comic books published by DC Comics. The 100 debuted in Superman's Girl Friend Lois Lane #105 (October 1970) and were created by Robert Kanigher and Ross Andru. The 1,000 debuted in Booster Gold #2 (March 1986) and were created by Dan Jurgens. The 10 debuted in Superman #665 (September 2007) and were created by Kurt Busiek and Rick Leonardi.

The 100 made their live-action debut in the television series Black Lightning. Additionally, Blackguard of the 1,000 appeared in the DC Extended Universe film The Suicide Squad (2021), portrayed by Pete Davidson.

Fictional team history

The 100
The 100, formerly known as El Ciento (the one hundred), was founded by 71 men and women from all over Europe who came together in Aragon, Spain in the year 1462, and named themselves El Ciento in order to honor their 29 dead allies. The surviving members of El Ciento combined various scientific, arcane and alchemical methods of life extension in order to render themselves immortal. At a later point in time, they were driven out of Aragon by the Spanish Inquisition, but by then they had granted themselves vastly extended lifespans. They later discovered that the only way they could stay alive was to own the land they lived on and to feed off the despair and negative emotions of the human tenants on their lands; they also learned how to become immaterial and possess human bodies. Though most members of El Ciento feed off human suffering, some few have been able to survive by feeding on positive emotions. The immortal known as Ra's al Ghul considers El Ciento to be a threat to his plans.

A member of El Ciento later established himself in Metropolis's Southside, an area which would later be known as Suicide Slum. The 100 held a firm grip on the city's criminal underworld for years, indulging in crimes such as drug trafficking and racketeering. They later seem to have spread across the country with branches operating in other cities. They have also made enemies of many heroes, including Rose and Thorn (whose father they murdered), Halo (whom they murdered as well as her parents), and Superman himself. As the 100, they fought foes like Black Lightning at the behest of the Metropolis section leader Tobias Whale.

The 10
A story in Superman #665 shows that during Superman's early years in Metropolis, there was a smaller organization called the 10, with ties to Intergang. According to Black Lightning: Year One #4 (April 2009), they have no ties to the 100 but may have ties to the 1,000.

The 1,000
The Director of the 1,000 was a U.S. senator named Henry Ballard who shepherded the organization's new direction and goals. Under the Director, the 100 changed its name to the 1,000, where it is attempting to expand their reach to even the Oval Office with Henry Ballard as the presidential candidate. This plan, however, was thwarted and the 1,000 became the 100 again upon retreating into the shadows. As the 1,000 they fought Booster Gold.

Members

100 Operatives
 Cyclotronic Man — Ned Creegan, accidentally subjected to an experimental "purple light ray". The ray made Creegan's skin transparent so that only his skeleton was visible, and charged him with electricity. As "Bag O' Bones", he fought Batman and Robin. As 100 operative Cyclotronic Man, he later tried to eliminate both Black Lightning and Superman, but was defeated.
 Joey Toledo — A drug pusher. He was later killed by a League of Assassins operative.
 Johnny "Stitches" Denetto — A crime boss who had his face peeled off by Tobias Whale back when Denetto used to work for him. Upon being saved by Intergang and joining up with them, Desaad sewed a new face onto him which was made from dead humans and animals.
 Malcolm Merlyn the Dark Archer — A mercenary archer who was also a member of the League of Assassins.
 Pajamas — An unnamed Asian martial artist nicknamed "Pajamas" by Black Lightning.
 Steel-Fist Feeny — Francis Feeny possesses a cybernetic right hand made out of steel.
 Syonide I — The mercenary called Syonide was hired by Tobias Whale and the 100 to capture Black Lightning and Peter Gambi. He committed suicide after believing he had murdered Black Lightning.
 Syonide II — The second Syonide was female. She first succeeded the original as an agent of the 100 and fought the Outsiders. Later, she became a mercenary in her own right, sometimes working together with Merlyn the Archer.
 Tobias Whale — Super-strong and tough albino enemy of Black Lightning. He is the leader of the 100's Metropolis branch.

1,000 Operatives
 Blackguard — Richard Hertz, an enforcer for the 1,000 who clashed with Booster Gold. Thorn was able to save Booster Gold and Blackguard from being killed by the 1,000. He later reformed and worked with Guy Gardner. Blackguard was killed by General Wade Eiling while serving on the Suicide Squad.
 Chiller — A shapeshifting super-assassin who nearly killed former President Ronald Reagan and former Vice-president George H. W. Bush at the behest of the 1,000.
 Director — Senator Henry Ballard is the forward-thinking leader of the 1,000. He was later killed in battle against Booster Gold, Blackguard, and Thorn.
 Doctor Shocker — Shocker serves the Director as a special interrogator. He specialized in the use of a highly advanced device called a "Psi-tap" that could read and transcribe a victim's thoughts.
 Mindancer — A supervillain who drains mental energy from others and stores it for use later as bolts of psionic force. She was second in command of the 1,000 behind the Director. Mindancer recently reappeared as a prison escapee during Infinite Crisis where she crossed paths with Kyle Rayner.
 Shockwave — A frequent agent of the 1,000, Arnold Pruett wears a suit of sophisticated armor that endows abilities such as super-strength and generating vibrations capable of leveling buildings. He originally fought Blue Devil. Shockwave would go on to battle Booster Gold and Superman. An action figure for Shockwave was in development for the Super Powers Collection before the line was cancelled.

In other media
 The 100 appears in Black Lightning, with Tobias Whale, Syonide, Joey Toledo, Latavius "Lala" Johnson, and Painkiller as prominent members. This version of the group operates in Freeland, with Whale as their leader after the gang was given to him by Lady Eve's bosses. In addition, some members of the Freeland Police Department are secretly on the 100's side. As of the fourth season, Lala has taken over leadership of the 100 while Whale runs for mayor.
 Richard "Dick" Hertz / Blackguard appears in  The Suicide Squad, portrayed by Pete Davidson. He is recruited into the eponymous team for a mission in Corto Maltese, where he betrays his teammates by warning the local military of their mission. When he tries to surrender upon making landfall, he is promptly shot and killed.

References

External links
 The 100 entry on the Superman Homepage

DC Comics supervillain teams
Characters created by Kurt Busiek
Characters created by Robert Kanigher
Characters created by Curt Swan
Comics characters introduced in 1970
Comics characters introduced in 1986
Comics characters introduced in 2007